Pselnophorus japonicus is a moth of the family Pterophoridae. It known from Japan (Honshu, Shikoku, Kyushu, Tsushima, Tanega-shima, Yakushima).

External links
Taxonomic And Biological Studies Of Pterophoridae Of Japan (Lepidoptera)
Japanese Moths

Oidaematophorini
Moths described in 1923
Endemic fauna of Japan
Moths of Asia
Moths of Japan